Tung Shin Academy of Nursing, abbreviated as TSAN, is a non-profit, private nursing college located in Pudu, Kuala Lumpur, Malaysia, affiliated to Tung Shin Hospital. Tung Shin Academy of Nursing was started in 1992. To date, more than 350 Assistant Nurses qualified from this academy are serving in various hospitals throughout Malaysia and Singapore.

Tung Shin Academy of Nursing is accredited and recognized by Nursing Board, Ministry of Health Malaysia.

Programmes
{
  "type": "ExternalData",
  "service": "geoshape",
  "ids": "Q17058479",
  "properties": {
    "title": "Tung Shin Academy of Nursing",
    "description": "Campus",
  }
}

In 1992, the academy began a two-year Certificate in Nursing Course, and three years full time Diploma in Nursing in 2012.

References

Colleges in Malaysia
Educational institutions established in 1992
1992 establishments in Malaysia
Nursing schools in Malaysia
Universities and colleges in Kuala Lumpur